Davida Kroll (
June 20, 1917 – December 9, 2011) was an Israeli actress and translator.

Kroll came to Israel in 1924 with her family.

Kroll played in movies and TV series such as Mivtza Savta, Florentin and Johnny. Kroll also translated over 20 books from Russian to Hebrew.

External links

Liron Sinai, Actress Davida Kroll dies 94, Ynet (Hebrew)

References

1917 births
2011 deaths
Monegasque Jews
Soviet emigrants to Mandatory Palestine
Israeli film actresses
Israeli Jews
Israeli stage actresses
Israeli television actresses
Jewish Israeli actresses
Translators from Russian
Translators to Hebrew
Israeli translators
20th-century translators
20th-century Israeli women writers